Nina Hamid is a Bangladeshi folk singer. She is notable for the songs "Amar Sonar Moyna Pakhi". She was awarded Ekushey Padak in 1994 by the Government of Bangladesh.

Early life
Hamid was born to Abu Mohammad Abdullah Khan and Sofrun Nessa. Nina Hamid's ancestral home is in Naoda village of Manikganj District.Her father was a police officer.

Personal life
Hamid is married to modern singer MA Hamid. Dancer Farhana Chowdhury is Hamid's niece.

Works
Hamid is one of the rarest talents of Bangladesh whose voice made the opulent heritage of Bangla Folk Music more appealing, heart touching and transcendental. She is still popular among the older generations. Hamid is mainly saluted and worshiped for singing the famous songs composed by Bangladesh's folk-poet Jasim Uddin. Hamid's songs mainly depict the sadness, sorrows, pathos of village women. Her "Amar Sonar Moina Pakhi" can easily render one upset and emotional, devoted to the inner meaning of the folk songs of Bengal. Her "Ujaan Ganger Naiyiaa", "Nao Ano Re Bhai", "Jogi Vikkha Loina", "Jare ja Chithi" are mostly applauded songs. Her "Amar Golar har Khule ne Na O Go Lolite" is arguably the most popular bicched (living-apart) folk song.

She has also sung some spiritual songs among those are "Ailam ar Gelam, Khailam ar Shyilam, Vobe Dekhlam Shunlam Kichui Bujhlamna", a famous folk-spiritual song written by Kuti Mansur. Her other songs are:

 Amar Nithur Bondhur
 Amar Praan Binodiyare
 Amar Praner Bondhu Kon
 Amar Sonar Moyna Pakhi
 Amay Paar Koro Re Ore
 Dukkho Je Moner Majhe
 Sagor Kuler Naaiya Re
 Tomaro Lagiya Re Shoda
 Ujan Ganger Naaiya Tumi

References

External links
 

Living people
20th-century Bangladeshi women singers
20th-century Bangladeshi singers
Recipients of the Ekushey Padak
Year of birth missing (living people)
Place of birth missing (living people)
People from Manikganj District